105 Marion Street is a historic house located in Brookline, Massachusetts. It is significant as a well-preserved local example of the Second Empire styling of architecture.

Description and history 
The -story wood-frame house was built in 1861–62. It has a typical mansard roof, with a central bell-shaped pediment above the centered front entrance. The pediment stands above a Palladian window with narrow side windows, which is above the main entry. The entry is sheltered by a porch supported by paired square columns.

The house was listed on the National Register of Historic Places on October 17, 1985.

See also
National Register of Historic Places listings in Brookline, Massachusetts

References

Houses in Brookline, Massachusetts
Second Empire architecture in Massachusetts
Houses completed in 1861
National Register of Historic Places in Brookline, Massachusetts
1861 establishments in Massachusetts
Houses on the National Register of Historic Places in Norfolk County, Massachusetts